Sead Hakšabanović ((Albanian: Sead Hakaj ; born 4 May 1999) is a professional footballer who plays as a winger or forward for Scottish club Celtic. He made his professional debut with Halmstads BK and trained in their youth system. Born in Sweden, he played for that country as a youth international but represents Montenegro at senior level, making his debut in 2017.

Club career

Halmstad
Hakšabanović represented Halmstads BK as a youth. He made his debut in Allsvenskan on 9 April 2015, coming on as a late substitute for Junes Barny in a 3–0 home loss against IFK Norrköping; at the age of only 15, he became the youngest-ever footballer to debut for Halmstad.

In August 2015 Hakšabanović spent a week on trial with Manchester United. He has also been on trials for Liverpool, Chelsea, Aston Villa and Manchester City.

After spending his first senior season with only ten appearances and no goals, Hakšabanović scored his first goal on 4 April 2016, netting his team's only in a 2–1 away loss against IK Sirius Fotboll.

West Ham United
In August 2017, Hakšabanović signed a five-year contract for West Ham United in a £2.7 million transfer from Halmstad. He made his debut for West Ham on 19 September, playing 63 minutes in a 3–0 home victory against Bolton Wanderers in the EFL Cup.

Loan to Málaga
On 6 August 2018, Hakšabanović joined Spanish Segunda División side Málaga CF on loan for one season. On 17 November 2018, he made his debut in a 2–0 win against Gimnàstic de Tarragona. In December 2018, West Ham director Mario Husillos expressed dissatisfaction with Hakšabanović's playing time at Málaga.

Loan to IFK Norrköping
In January 2019, he joined IFK Norrköping on loan until the end of the 2019–20 season. On 2 November 2019, he scored a goal and made an assist in a 2–2 tie against 2019 Allsvenskan champions Djurgårdens IF.

IFK Norrköping
In June 2020, Hakšabanović completed a transfer for an undisclosed fee to IFK Norrköping. During his time in IFK Norrköping he made 36 appearances, in which he produced 7 goals and 16 assists.

FC Rubin Kazan
On 27 May 2021, Hakšabanović moved to Russian club Rubin Kazan, in a transfer that IFK Norrköping described as their biggest sale ever. Rubin signed a 5-year contract with him and he was assigned shirt number 99.

Following the temporary suspension of his contract with Rubin Kazan, due to the Russian invasion of Ukraine, Hakšabanović joined Djurgården until 30 June 2022.

Celtic
On 25 August 2022, Hakšabanović joined Scottish Premiership side Celtic on a five-year deal. Six days later, he would make his debut for the club as a late substitute for Daizen Maeda in a 4-1 away win against Ross County in the Scottish League Cup.

On 6 September 2022, Hakšabanović made his UEFA Champions League debut against Real Madrid at Celtic Park where he came on as a 82nd minute substitute for Jota in a 3-0 defeat. On 14 September 2022, he started the second group stage match of Celtic's 2022-23 Champions League campaign against Shakhtar Donetsk in the Stadion Wojska Polskiego, where Celtic drew with Shakhtar 1-1.

On 5 November 2022, Hakšabanović scored his first goal and brace for Celtic as they beat Dundee United 4-2 at home in the Scottish Premiership. His form would see him awarded with the Premiership Player of the Month for November.

International career
Although born in Sweden and having played in Sweden's youth selection, Hakšabanović opted to play for Montenegro, where his family is from. He made his international senior debut for the Montenegrin national team in a 4–1 2018 FIFA World Cup qualification victory over Armenia, on 10 June 2017. On 19 November 2019, he scored his first international goal in a 2–0 friendly win over Belarus.

Career statistics

Club

International

As of match played 19 November 2019. Montenegro score listed first, score column indicates score after each Haksabanovic goal.

Honours
Celtic

 Scottish League Cup: 2022–23

Individual
Allsvenskan Top assist provider: 2020

References

External links
 
 Halmstads profile 
 
 
 

1999 births
Living people
People from Småland
Swedish people of Montenegrin descent
Swedish people of Bosnia and Herzegovina descent
Bosniaks of Montenegro
Association football midfielders
Association football forwards
Association football wingers
Swedish footballers
Sweden youth international footballers
Montenegrin footballers
Montenegro international footballers
Halmstads BK players
West Ham United F.C. players
Málaga CF players
IFK Norrköping players
FC Rubin Kazan players
Djurgårdens IF Fotboll players
Allsvenskan players
Superettan players
Segunda División players
Russian Premier League players
Montenegrin expatriate footballers
Expatriate footballers in England
Swedish expatriate sportspeople in England
Montenegrin expatriate sportspeople in England
Expatriate footballers in Spain
Montenegrin expatriate sportspeople in Spain
Swedish expatriate sportspeople in Spain
Expatriate footballers in Russia
Montenegrin expatriate sportspeople in Russia
Swedish expatriate sportspeople in Russia
Montenegrin people of Albanian descent
Swedish people of Albanian descent
Celtic F.C. players
Expatriate footballers in Scotland
Montenegrin expatriate sportspeople in Scotland
Swedish expatriate sportspeople in Scotland